Nymphaea micrantha is a water lily belonging to the genus Nymphaea. It is native to the tropics of West Africa. Its leaves are oval or round, 8-12 cm long, with a cluster of bulbils on the top of the leaf stalk. Flowers can reach up to 10 cm in diameter, and appear from approximately September to October.  The plant usually grows to a height of 20–80 cm (8–32 inches). It cannot be grown .

References

External links

micrantha
Flora of West Tropical Africa